Rumen Goranov (born 15 July 1984) is a Bulgarian footballer.

References

1984 births
Living people
Bulgarian footballers
First Professional Football League (Bulgaria) players
PFC Lokomotiv Plovdiv players
FC Lokomotiv 1929 Sofia players
Association football midfielders